The year 516 BC was a year of the pre-Julian Roman calendar. In the Roman Empire, it was known as year 238 Ab urbe condita . The denomination 516 BC for this year has been used since the early medieval period, when the Anno Domini calendar era became the prevalent method in Europe for naming years.

Events

By place

Greece 
 Cleomenes received an embassy from Maeandrius of Samos asking him for help to expel the tyrant Syloson, a puppet of the Persian Empire, which was at the time subjugating the city-states of the eastern Aegean sea.

India 
 The Persian king Darius I occupies Punjab.

Deaths 
King Ping of Chu - King of the State of Chu from 528 to 516 BC

References